Aleksandr Gennadyevich Alekseyev (born 23 August 1989) is a Russian former football forward.

Club career
He made his debut in the Russian Second Division for FC Pskov-747 on 4 September 2013 in a game against FC Rus Saint Petersburg.

He made his Russian Football National League debut for FC Tekstilshchik Ivanovo on 5 October 2019 in a game against FC Armavir.

References

External links
 

1989 births
Footballers from Saint Petersburg
Living people
Russian footballers
Russian expatriate footballers
Expatriate footballers in Estonia
Meistriliiga players
JK Narva Trans players
FC Tosno players
FC Tekstilshchik Ivanovo players
Association football forwards
Russian expatriate sportspeople in Estonia